
Gmina Godkowo is a rural gmina (administrative district) in Elbląg County, Warmian-Masurian Voivodeship, in northern Poland.

Villages
Gmina Godkowo contains the villages and settlements of Bielica, Burdajny, Cieszyniec, Dąbkowo, Dobry, Godkowo, Grądki, Grużajny, Gwiździny, Kępno, Klekotki, Krykajny, Kwitajny Wielkie, Łępno, Lesiska, Miłosna, Nawty, Nowe Wikrowo, Olkowo, Osiek, Piskajny, Plajny, Podągi, Siedlisko, Skowrony, Stary Cieszyn, Stojpy, Swędkowo, Szymbory, Ząbrowiec and Zimnochy.

Neighbouring gminas
Gmina Godkowo is bordered by the gminas of Miłakowo, Morąg, Orneta, Pasłęk and Wilczęta.

References
Polish official population figures 2006

Godkowo
Elbląg County